Zita Ajkler (born 9 June 1975) is a Hungarian long jumper. She is a 16-time Hungarian national champion in the long jump, triple jump, heptathlon, and 100-meter hurdles. Her personal best is 676 cm in the long jump and 13.99 m in the triple jump (the national record is 14.00 m); 13.75 s in 100-meter hurdles (wind-1.2), 8.35 s in 60-meter hurdles, and 5,323 points in the heptathlon.

Ajkler began by pole vaulting recreationally, achieved 360 cm in training after 3 months of practice, but never competed in this event. Her first big achievement was in 1998, at the European Athletics Championships in Budapest, where she came in 6th with a personal best of 664 cm. She reached 6th place again in Vienna at the indoor European Athletics Championships in 2002.
Ajkler has competed during two Olympic Games: Sydney 2000 and Athens 2004; she did not reach the finals, however.

Ajkler competed three times at the World University Games: 1999 - Mallorca, 2001 - Beijing, and 2003 - Daegu (long jump, triple jump, and 4X100-meter relay in all competitions). She reached the finals (top 8) in all events. Her best result was winning 3rd in 2003 in the long jump. Her worst result was getting 7th place in 2001, triple jump.

In 2004 she injured her left foot before the Games and couldn't recover for 18 months. She started to train once more in 2005. Four days before her first competition in January 2006, she broke her right ankle. She couldn't return with full health after two surgeries at the end of 2007, but still tried to reach the Olympic qualification level in 2008. This was set at 665 cm but Ajkler only jumped 645 cm, thus missing her third chance at the Olympics.

In 2010, Ajkler won the European Masters Championships in Nyíregyháza in the triple jump and came 2nd in the long jump.
She retired from competing but returned and competed for the last time in 2014 at the indoor World Masters Championships in Budapest. She won in the triple jump as well as in the long jump. Following this, she ended her sport career as a track and field athlete.

Ajkler now works for television sports network Eurosport in Hungary. She is a commentator for track and field, figure skating, and extreme sports. She is also a physical conditioning and coordination coach, helping the national women's sabre team.

Achievements

Personal bests
 Triple jump - 13.99 m (2002)
 Long jump - 6.76 m (2004)

References
 

Living people
Hungarian female long jumpers
Athletes (track and field) at the 2000 Summer Olympics
Athletes (track and field) at the 2004 Summer Olympics
Olympic athletes of Hungary
Universiade medalists in athletics (track and field)
1975 births
Commentators
Universiade bronze medalists for Hungary
Medalists at the 2003 Summer Universiade